Pace is a census-designated place in Santa Rosa County, Florida. As of the 2020 United States census, the population was 24,684. It is the largest community in Northern Santa Rosa County, and is a part of the Pensacola Metropolitan Statistical Area. Pace has experienced exponential growth, and has evolved from a small, rural community to a thriving bedroom community of Pensacola with growing residential and commercial options. From 2000 to 2010, the Pace CDP population growth percentage was 171.1%, and from 2010 to 2020, the population growth percentage was 22.8%.

Geography
Pace is located in the Western Florida Panhandle, just north of Escambia Bay in Santa Rosa County. Pace comprises the 32571 ZIP code, and is located northeast of Pensacola, and west of Milton. Pace is located approximately 25 minutes driving distance away from Downtown Pensacola.

History
Pace was first recognized in the 1912 United States Census. It was located just north of the Floridatown. Pace is named after James G. Pace, who owned large lumber, paper and turpentine productions that operated in the Pace area. On March 12, 1919, Black veteran Bud Johnson was lynched as part of the Red Summer of 1919. Throughout the 20th century, Pace remained a small, rural community. However, beginning in 1980, Pace began to experience rapid growth and began to evolve from a small, rural community to a fast-growing bedroom community of Pensacola. Commercial growth has also been strong: chain restaurants, chain retailers, and Big-box retailers such as Dick's Sporting Goods, Walmart, and Target have moved into the Pace area. Floridatown and Pea Ridge are now considered to be neighborhoods within Pace. Pace continues to experience strong population growth, and the growth trend is expected to continue despite remaining an unincorporated community.

Education
Schools in Pace are administered by the Santa Rosa County School District. Schools in the Pace area perform well, with all schools receiving an A or B rating according to the Florida Department of Education.

High schools
 Pace High School
  Lead Academy * Private Christian School

Middle schools
 Avalon Middle School
 Thomas L. Sims Middle School
  Lead Academy * Private Christian School

Elementary schools
 Bennett C. Russell Elementary School
 Pea Ridge Elementary School
 S.S. Dixon Primary School
 S.S. Dixon Intermediate School
  Lead Academy * Private Christian School

Demographics

Based on the 2020 census there were 24,684 people, and 8,152 households in the CDP. The racial makeup of the CDP was 87.70% White, 3.90% African American, 0.3% Native American, 2.10% Asian, and 4.8% from two or more races. The average household size was 2.8.

The age distribution was 6.5% under the age of 5, 24% under the age of 18, and 16.3% who were 65 or older. Females made up 50.3% of the population, whereas males made up 49.7%.

The median household income (in 2019 dollars), from 2015-2019 was $70,292. 8,5% of the population were below the poverty line.

References

Pensacola metropolitan area
Census-designated places in Santa Rosa County, Florida
Census-designated places in Florida